is a Japanese politician of the Liberal Democratic Party, a member of the House of Representatives in the Diet (national legislature). A native of Mitaka, Tokyo and graduate of Chuo University, she became the Superintendent of Education for the island of Aogashima in 2002, working there for three years. In 2005, she was elected to the House of Representatives.

See also 
 Koizumi Children

References 
 

Living people
1964 births
People from Mitaka, Tokyo
Chuo University alumni
Koizumi Children
Female members of the House of Representatives (Japan)
Members of the House of Representatives (Japan)
Liberal Democratic Party (Japan) politicians
Politicians from Tokyo
21st-century Japanese women politicians